The French occupation of Malta lasted from 1798 to 1800. It was established when the Order of Saint John surrendered to Napoleon Bonaparte following the French landing in June 1798. In Malta, the French established a constitutional tradition in Maltese history (as part of the French Republic), granted free education for all, and theoretically established freedom of the press, although only the pro-French newspaper Journal de Malte was actually published during the occupation.

The French abolished nobility, slavery, the feudal system, and the inquisition. The only remaining architectural reminder of the French occupation is probably the defacement of most coats of arms on the façades of buildings of the knights.  The Maltese soon rebelled against the French and drove the French garrison into Valletta and the Grand Harbour fortifications where they were besieged for more than two years. The French surrendered Malta when their food supplies were about to run out.

French invasion of Malta

On 19 May 1798, a French fleet sailed from Toulon, escorting an expeditionary force of over 30,000 men under General Napoleon Bonaparte. The force was destined for Egypt, Bonaparte seeking to expand French influence in Asia and force Britain to make peace in the French Revolutionary Wars, which had begun in 1792.  Sailing southeast, the convoy collected additional transports from Italian ports and at 05:30 on 9 June arrived off Valletta. At this time, Malta and its neighbouring islands were ruled by the Order of Saint John, an old and influential feudal order that Holy Roman Empire's Frederick Barbarossa had pledged his protection to. The Order was weakened by the loss of most of their revenue during the French Revolution. Nevertheless Grandmaster Ferdinand von Hompesch zu Bolheim, refused Bonaparte's demand that his entire convoy be allowed to enter Grand Harbour and take on supplies, insisting that Malta's neutrality meant that only two ships could enter at a time.

On receiving this reply, Bonaparte immediately ordered his fleet to bombard Valletta and, on 11 June, General Louis Baraguey d'Hilliers directed an amphibious operation in which several thousand soldiers landed at seven strategic sites around the island. Many of the French Knights deserted the order (although some fought for it valiantly), and the remaining Knights failed to mount a meaningful resistance. Approximately 2,000 native Maltese militia resisted for 24 hours, retreating to Valletta once the city of Mdina fell to General Claude-Henri Belgrand de Vaubois. Although Valletta was strong enough to hold out against a lengthy siege, Bonaparte negotiated a surrender with Hompesch, who agreed to turn Malta and all of its resources over to the French in exchange for estates and pensions in France for himself and his knights. Bonaparte then established a French garrison on the islands, leaving 4,000 men under Vaubois while he and the rest of the expeditionary force sailed eastwards for Alexandria on 19 June.

Reforms

During Napoleon's short stay in Malta, he stayed in Palazzo Parisio in Valletta (currently used as the Ministry for Foreign Affairs). He implemented a number of reforms which were based on the principles of the French Revolution. These reforms could be divided into four main categories:

Social
The people of Malta were granted equality before the law, and they were regarded as French citizens. The Maltese nobility was abolished, and slaves were freed. Napoleon decided to set up a government ruled by 5 Maltese people that would govern Malta. Freedom of speech and the press were granted, although the only newspaper was Journal de Malte, which was published by the government. Political prisoners including Mikiel Anton Vassalli and those who took part in the Rising of the Priests were released, while the Jewish population was given permission to build a synagogue.

Administrative
All of the Order's property was surrendered to the French Government. A Commission of Government was set up to rule the islands, and it was made up of the following people:

Moreover, Malta was divided into cantons and municipalities. Each was run by a president, secretary and four members:

A National Guard was also set up, with 900 men.

Educational
Primary schools were to be set up in the main towns and villages, while 60 students were to be allowed to study in France. The University of Malta was to be renamed Polytecnique, and scientific subjects were to be taught there. However, none of these reforms were actually implemented due to the short duration of French rule.

Church-State relations
The church's extensive property on Malta was taken over by the Government, and religious orders were only allowed to keep one convent each. The Inquisition was also abolished, and the last inquisitor was expelled from the islands.

Later on, French troops began to loot church property, and this was one of the main reasons for the Maltese uprising.

Maltese uprising

The French rapidly dismantled the institutions of the Knights of St. John, including the Roman Catholic Church, and the Maltese people were not happy about this. There were economic problems and the French government did not pay wages or pensions anymore, and began taking gold and silver from banks and palaces of the Order.

Church property was looted and seized to pay for the expedition to Egypt, an act that generated considerable anger among the deeply religious Maltese population. On 2 September, this anger erupted in a popular uprising during an auction of church property, and within days thousands of Maltese irregulars had driven the French garrison into Valletta and the Harbour area. Valletta was surrounded by approximately 10,000 irregular Maltese soldiers led by Emmanuele Vitale and Canon Francesco Saverio Caruana, but the fortress was too strong for the irregulars to assault. The Maltese built siege fortifications surrounding the harbour area to bombard French positions.

Help from Britain arrived later in the year and, in 1799, Captain Alexander Ball was appointed Civil Commissioner of Malta. The French garrison in Valletta finally surrendered to the British on 5 September 1800, and were taken to Toulon aboard British ships, with Malta becoming a British protectorate.

Gozo

On 28 October 1798, Ball successfully completed negotiations with the French garrison on the small island of Gozo, the 217 French soldiers there agreeing to surrender without a fight and transferring the island to the British. The British transferred the island to the locals that day, and it was administered by Archpriest Saverio Cassar on behalf of Ferdinand III of Sicily. Gozo remained independent until Cassar was removed from power by the British in 1801.

Further reading

References

 
1798 establishments in Malta
1800 disestablishments in Malta
States and territories established in 1798
States and territories disestablished in 1800